Jacques Roger Gaston Bonnet (18 September 1938 – 22 August 1986) was a French field hockey player. He competed in the men's tournament at the 1960 Summer Olympics.

References

External links
 

1938 births
1986 deaths
French male field hockey players
Olympic field hockey players of France
Field hockey players at the 1960 Summer Olympics
Sportspeople from Angers